Bruce Maitland Godfrey (27 March 1885 – 7 October 1947) was an Australian rules footballer who played with Richmond and Essendon in the Victorian Football League (VFL).

Notes

External links 

1885 births
1947 deaths
Australian rules footballers from Victoria (Australia)
Richmond Football Club players
Essendon Football Club players